Harry George Thomas Groves (2 March 1918 – 24 December 1997) was a male boxer who competed for England.

Boxing career
Groves represented England and won a gold medal in the 60 kg division at the 1938 British Empire Games in Sydney, New South Wales, Australia.

He won the 1939 Amateur Boxing Association British lightweight title, when boxing out of the Devas ABC.

Personal life
He was a brewers drayman by trade and lived in Condell Road, Battersea during 1938.

References

1918 births
1997 deaths
English male boxers
Boxers at the 1938 British Empire Games
Commonwealth Games medallists in boxing
Commonwealth Games gold medallists for England
Lightweight boxers
Medallists at the 1938 British Empire Games